Royal County may refer to:

Berkshire in England
County Meath in Ireland